The , often abbreviated as Gosenshū ("Later Collection"), is an imperial anthology of Japanese waka compiled in 951 at the behest of Emperor Murakami by the Five Men of the Pear Chamber: Ōnakatomi no Yoshinobu (922-991), Kiyohara no Motosuke (908-990), Minamoto no Shitagō (911-983), Ki no Tokibumi (flourished ~950), and Sakanoue no Mochiki (flourished ~950). It consists of twenty volumes containing 1,426 poems.

The collection has no preface and there are no contemporary writings that explain the compilers' intentions, nor is there any evidence that it was formally presented to the Emperor. In comparison to the Kokin Wakashū which preceded it, the Gosenshū focuses more on private poems, particularly poetry exchanges. It has a large number of poems that seem more like fictional poem tales, and even the poems by named authors frequently have long prose prefaces.

References

 pg. 482-483 of Japanese Court Poetry, Earl Miner, Robert H. Brower. 1961, Stanford University Press, LCCN 61-10925

External links
 Gosen Wakashū text from the Japanese Text Initiative

Japanese poetry anthologies
10th century in Japan
10th-century literature
951